The spouse of the prime minister of India is the wife or husband of the prime minister of India. The prime minister's spouse does not have an officially defined role. According to protocol, they attend social functions and gatherings at home and overseas, but have no participatory role.

To date there have been 10 women and one man who have been married to prime ministers whilst in office. India has also had one bachelor, one estranged, one widow, and two widower prime ministers.

List

See also
 List of prime ministers of India
 First ladies and gentlemen of India
 Spouse of the vice president of India

Notes

References

Lists of Indian people
India
India politics-related lists
1946 births
Living people
Lists relating to prime ministers of India